Kerry Marie Rea (born 16 April 1963) is an Australian politician. She was an Australian Labor Party member of the Australian House of Representatives from 2007 to 2010, representing the Division of Bonner in Queensland.

Early life
Rea was born in Bundaberg, Queensland. As an adult, she and her siblings discovered that her mother's grandmother Nellie Richards was an Indigenous Australian from Central Queensland. Rea was educated by nuns at the Mount Carmel Convent in Wynnum. She holds the degree of Bachelor of Arts from the University of Queensland.

Politics
Before gaining elected office, Rea worked for a Queensland State Minister.

She was then elected as a Brisbane City councillor, representing the ward of Ekibin from 1991 to 1994 and the ward of Holland Park from 1997 to 2007.

Rea won the seat of Bonner for the Labor Party from the Liberal Party at the 2007 federal election. It was one of a number of Labor gains at that election which propelled the party from opposition to government. Rea lost the seat to Ross Vasta at the 2010 election.

Education
Rea graduated from school in Wynnum, and later studied at the University of Queensland for a Bachelor of Arts majoring in English, History and Philosophy.

Personal life
Rea is married to Ian and she has three children. The eldest being Emma Mallory; a Brisbane-based actress, writer and producer.

References

External links
 Parliamentary web page
 Kerry Rea - personal web site

1963 births
Living people
Australian Labor Party members of the Parliament of Australia
Members of the Australian House of Representatives for Bonner
Members of the Australian House of Representatives
Women members of the Australian House of Representatives
People from Bundaberg
21st-century Australian politicians
21st-century Australian women politicians
University of Queensland alumni